Old Lady Drivers is the debut album by the metal band OLD. It was made as a parody of the grindcore acts of the 1980s.

Track listing

 "Total Hag" - 2:49
 "Corpse Full of Gunk" - 1:31
 "Supermarket Monstrosity" - 0:56
 "Lepers w/o Feet" 2:04
 "Tracheotomy Peashooter" - 2:00
 "Wisdom Lost" 4:28
 "Cocaine (JJ Cale Cover) - 3:26
 "Die In Your Beauty Sleep" - 1:48
 "Special Olympics" - 3:32
 "I Laugh As I Chew" - 3:31
 "Colostomy Grab-bag" - 1:37
 "Feeding the Worms" - 1:58
 "Old Ladies Always Break Their Hips" - 1:59
 "Bathrooms Rule" - 1:29
 "Screaming Geezer" - 1:36

Credits

Alan Dubin (vocals)
James Plotkin (guitars, bass, vocals)
Ralph Pimentel (drums, vocals)

References

External links
 Encyclopaedia Metallum page

1988 debut albums
OLD (band) albums